Cornelius B. Murphy (a.k.a. "Monk" and "Razzle Dazzle") (October 15, 1863 – August 1, 1914) was a professional baseball player who played pitcher in the Major Leagues for the 1884 Philadelphia Quakers of the National League and the 1890 Brooklyn Ward's Wonders of the Players' League. In between, he played in the minor leagues.

External links

1863 births
1914 deaths
19th-century baseball players
Major League Baseball pitchers
Philadelphia Quakers players
Brooklyn Ward's Wonders players
Newark Domestics players
Trenton Trentonians players
Haverhill (minor league baseball) players
Syracuse Stars (minor league baseball) players
Minneapolis Millers (baseball) players
Oshkosh (minor league baseball) players
Worcester (minor league baseball) players
Elmira Gladiators players
Albany Senators players
Minor league baseball managers
Baseball players from Worcester, Massachusetts